Croatia competed at the 1994 Winter Olympics in Lillehammer, Norway with three athletes in two sports.

Competitors
The following is the list of number of competitors in the Games.

Alpine skiing

Men

Cross country skiing

Men

References

Sources
Official Olympic Reports

Nations at the 1994 Winter Olympics
1994